Sinaly Diomandé (born  9 April 2001) is an Ivorian professional footballer who plays for Ligue 1 side Lyon and the Ivory Coast national team.

Club career 
Diomandé came out of the Jean-Marc Guillou academy in Abidjan, before joining the Guidars FC, in Mali. He moved to Olympique Lyonnais in September 2019 for a fee of €550,000, with bonuses rising up to €2 million. 

After a year of playing in Lyon's reserve team, where he became one of the players most used by Gueïda Fofana, and an impressive summer preparation, Diomande made his professional debut for Olympique Lyonnais on 18 September 2020, helping his team keep a clean sheet against Nîmes in this Ligue 1 encounter.

International career
Diomandé debuted with the Ivory Coast national football team in a 1–1 friendly draw with Belgium on 8 October 2020.

Career statistics

Club

International

References

External links
 Profile at the Olympique Lyonnais website
 
 JMG FOotball Profile

2001 births
Living people
People from Lacs District
Ivorian footballers
Ivory Coast international footballers
Association football defenders
Olympique Lyonnais players
Ligue 1 players
Championnat National 2 players
Ivorian expatriate footballers
Ivorian expatriate sportspeople in France
Expatriate footballers in France